"It's Hard to be Humble" is a song written and recorded by American country music artist Mac Davis from his LP, Hard To Be Humble.  It became an international hit in the spring of 1980.

A version by T.R. Dallas became a Top 20 hit in Ireland during the fall of the year. The song was covered by Rolf Harris in 1980 and Willie Nelson in 2019. The song was additionally covered in Dutch in 1981 by Peter Blanker under the name of "'t Is moeilijk bescheiden te blijven", which became a top 10 hit in the Netherlands.

Chart history

Weekly charts

T.R. Dallas cover

Year-end charts

Certifications

References

External links
 
 

1980 songs
1980 singles
Mac Davis songs
Songs written by Mac Davis
Casablanca Records singles
Song recordings produced by Larry Butler (producer)